The Hundred Acre Woods is an American indie folk band from Chester County, Pennsylvania.

History
The Hundred Acre Woods began in 2009. A years later, they began recording their first self-titled EP, which was released in 2011. as well as their first full-length album, Mountaineers Are Always Free. In 2013, the band released a 7" split with fellow Pennsylvanian band Modern Baseball. Also in 2013, The Hundred Acre Woods were featured on a Topshelf Records split alongside Modern Baseball, Julia Brown, and Old Gray. In 2014, the band released a 7" EP titled Cold In The Morning.

References

Musical groups from Pennsylvania
American folk musical groups
Lame-O Records artists